Răchitoasa is a commune in Bacău County, Western Moldavia, Romania. It is composed of fifteen villages: Barcana, Bucșa, Buda, Burdusaci, Dănăila, Dumbrava, Farcașa, Fundătura Răchitoasa, Hăghiac, Magazia, Movilița, Oprișești, Putini, Răchitoasa and Tochilea.

Natives
 Maria Tacu
 Ștefan Zeletin

References

Communes in Bacău County
Localities in Western Moldavia